José Antonio García Belaunde is a Peruvian career diplomat, who served as Foreign Minister during the Second Presidency of Alan Garcia from 2006 to 2011, making him the only Foreign Affairs Minister to serve a complete term. On August 2, 2011, his successor in office, Rafael Roncagliolo announced his appointment as Peru's co-agent before the Court of The Hague.

In 2016, President Pedro Pablo Kuczinsky appointed him Ambassador to Spain where he served until 2018, when he assumed the post of Representative to Europe for the CAF-Latin American Development Bank.

Early life and education 
García Belaunde was born in Lima on 16 March 1948. He is the son of distinguished jurist Domingo García Rada, who presided the Supreme Court (1967-1968) and grandson of Victor Andrés Belaunde, Peruvian diplomat who was President of the General Assembly of the United Nations. His brother, Victor Andrés García Belaunde, is a former Congressman and politician and his uncle, Fernando Belaunde Terry was elected President of Peru twice.

He studied at Colegio de la Inmaculada in Lima and then in Colegio Winnetka. He studied Literature and Linguistics at Pontificia Universidad Católica del Perú, where he became a close friend of President Alan García. He earned a Post Graduate Diploma in Foreign Policy from the University of Oxford, and also attended the Diplomatic Academy of Peru, graduating with a BA in International Relations. He holds a Master's Degree in International Relations, International Law and International Economics at Instituto Universitario Ortega y Gasset in Madrid.

Career 
In July 2006, García Belaunde became Peru's Minister of Foreign Affairs. During his mandate, Peru submitted a maritime delimitation dispute with Chile to the International Court of Justice in The Hague. The ruling was mostly favorable to Peru. It is to be noted that prior to the final decision of the ICJ, Peru signed a maritime delimitation agreement with Ecuador. He recounts his experiences in "El largo camino a La Haya", published in El Comercio, Lima, 29 enero, 2014. http://3.elcomercio.e3.pe/doc/0/0/8/1/7/817213.pdf

Peru also finalized a Free Trade Agreement with the United States which was approved by Congress, and also signed FTAs with the European Union, China, Japan, et al. With President García's leadership, he launched the Alianza del Pacífico, the most successful initiative in terms of regional integration in Latin America. He negotiated with Yale University the recuperation of prehispanic pottery and artifacts from Machu Picchu that had been lent to the university one hundred years before. Also during this period, Peru was a non-permanent member of the United Nations Security Council (2006-2007).

Diplomatic career

He has served at the Permanent Mission of Peru to the United Nations, as well as in the embassies in France, Mexico, Spain, Ecuador, the United States of America and the Latin American Free Trade Association, ALADI, in Uruguay. He also served as Director-Secretario and Director General at the Comunidad Andina de Naciones (1990-2006).

Academic activities

He has been a lecturer at the Academia Diplomática del Perú and at the Instituto de Gobierno y Gestión Pública de la Universidad de San Martín de Porres. He prologued and edited Política Exterior Peruana. Teoría y práctica, by Carlos García Bedoya, Mosca Azul Editores, Lima, 1981, and wrote "Carlos García Bedoya: el primer decenio", Mosca Azul Editores, Lima, 1993.

He published "Dos siglos de desafíos en la política exterior peruana" as part of the Colección Nudos de la República, Biblioteca Bicentenario, Lima, 2021.

References

List of his Diplomatic posts

Peruvian people of Spanish descent
People from Lima
1948 births
Living people
Permanent Representatives of Peru to the United Nations
Foreign ministers of Peru
Peruvian diplomats
Ambassadors of Peru to Uruguay
Knights Grand Cross of the Order of Isabella the Catholic
Grand Cross of the Order of Civil Merit